was a railway station on the Sōya Main Line in Monponai, Bifuka, Hokkaido, Japan, operated by the Hokkaido Railway Company (JR Hokkaido).

Lines served
Momponai Station is served by the Sōya Main Line.

Station layout
The station is unstaffed, and consists of a basic waiting room with toilet facilities.

Adjacent stations

History
Momponai Station opened on 3 November 1911.

Surrounding area
 National Route 40
 Teshio River

References

External links

 Momponai Station information (JR Hokkaido) 

Railway stations in Hokkaido Prefecture
Railway stations in Japan opened in 1911
Railway stations closed in 2021